Ivar Larsen Kirkeby-Garstad (5 August 1877 – 19 June 1951) was a Norwegian politician for the Agrarian Party.

He was elected to the Parliament of Norway from Nord-Trøndelag in 1921, and was re-elected on five consecutive occasions. He last served as a deputy representative during the term 1945–1949. 
He was also acting Minister of Agriculture from February to March 1932 in Kolstad's Cabinet, and Minister of Trade, Shipping, Industry, Craft and Fisheries from March 1932 to March 1933 in Hundseid's Cabinet.

He was the father of politician Lars Reidulv Kirkeby-Garstad (1907–1977).

References

External links 
 Ivar Larsen Kirkeby-Garstad at Store norske leksikon 

1877 births
1951 deaths
Centre Party (Norway) politicians
Members of the Storting
Ministers of Agriculture and Food of Norway
Government ministers of Norway